Ian Butler (born 1 February 1944 in Darton, Barnsley) is an English former professional footballer who played in the Football League as a left winger for Rotherham United, Hull City, York City and Barnsley. His son, Martin Butler, also played for York City.

Club career
Butler began his career at Rotherham United where he established himself down the left wing and played alongside players such as Ken Houghton in a highly promising team with a significant number of locally developed players. Together with Houghton, he moved to Hull City during the 1964–65 season, much to the displeasure of Rotherham's fans. He became part of a formidable attacking line including Ray Henderson, Ken Wagstaff and Chris Chilton, whose performances took Hull City to the Third Division title in 1966 and established the side as a Second Division force in the 1960s and 1970s. He finished his League career with York City and a loan spell at Barnsley.

International career
He was capped by the England national youth team in 1962.

References

External links

1944 births
Living people
Footballers from Barnsley
English footballers
England youth international footballers
Association football wingers
Rotherham United F.C. players
Hull City A.F.C. players
York City F.C. players
Barnsley F.C. players
Bridlington Town A.F.C. players
English Football League players